Trebishte Island is a rocky island 770 m long in southeast–northwest direction and 380 m wide lying in Perrier Bay on the northwest coast of Anvers Island in the Palmer Archipelago, Antarctica.  It is separated from Anvers Island to the south and Vromos Island to the north by 300 m and 220 m wide passages respectively.

The island is named after the settlement of Trebishte in Southern Bulgaria.

Location
British mapping in 1980.

Maps
 British Antarctic Territory.  Scale 1:200000 topographic map.  DOS 610 Series, Sheet W 64 62.  Directorate of Overseas Surveys, UK, 1980.
 Antarctic Digital Database (ADD). Scale 1:250000 topographic map of Antarctica. Scientific Committee on Antarctic Research (SCAR). Since 1993, regularly upgraded and updated.

References
 Bulgarian Antarctic Gazetteer. Antarctic Place-names Commission. (details in Bulgarian, basic data in English)
 Trebishte Island. SCAR Composite Antarctic Gazetteer.

External links
 Trebishte Island. Copernix satellite image

Islands of the Palmer Archipelago
Bulgaria and the Antarctic